Abdul Malik Abubakari (born 10 May 2000) is a Ghanaian footballer who plays as a forward for Slovak club ŠK Slovan Bratislava on loan from Malmö FF.

Career statistics

Club

Honours

Malmö FF
 Allsvenskan: 2021
 Svenska Cupen: 2021–22
HJK 

 Veikkausliiga: 2022

References

 

2000 births
Living people
Ghanaian footballers
Association football forwards
Charity Stars F.C. players
F.C. Vizela players
Moreirense F.C. players
AD Fafe players
Casa Pia A.C. players
Malmö FF players
Helsingin Jalkapalloklubi players
ŠK Slovan Bratislava players
Campeonato de Portugal (league) players
Liga Portugal 2 players
Allsvenskan players
Veikkausliiga players
Ghanaian expatriate footballers
Ghanaian expatriate sportspeople in Portugal
Expatriate footballers in Portugal
Ghanaian expatriate sportspeople in Sweden
Expatriate footballers in Sweden
Ghanaian expatriate sportspeople in Finland
Expatriate footballers in Finland
Ghanaian expatriate sportspeople in Slovakia
Expatriate footballers in Slovakia